TCF Financial Corporation was a bank holding company based in Detroit, Michigan. The current incarnation of the company was formed by a 2019 merger between the former TCF, which was established in 1923 in Wayzata, Minnesota, and the Michigan-based Chemical Financial Corporation. In December 2020, TCF announced a merger with Huntington Bancshares.  It was announced on May 26, 2021, that TCF Bank will be required by the Department of Justice to sell off 13 branches in Michigan. These branches were purchased by Horizon Bank at the end of the third quarter. The final approval has been given for the merger and the merger was complete on June 9, 2021. The combined bank has $175 billion in assets.

History
The company traces its roots to both TCF Financial Corporation and Chemical Financial Corporation, which merged in 2019.

Chemical Financial Corporation
Chemical State Savings Bank was founded in 1917. 

In 1937, the headquarters of Chemical Bank was the site of the infamous bank robbery by Tony Chebatoris, which resulted in Chebatoris being the only man to receive the death penalty in the state of Michigan.

In 1964, the bank changed its name to Chemical Bank Trust.

In 1974, the bank changed its name to Chemical Bank.

In May 2010, the bank acquired O.A.K. Financial Corporation.

In October 2014, the bank acquired Northwestern Bank for $121 million in cash.

In April 2015, the bank acquired Monarch Community Bancorp for $27.2 million in stock.

In June 2015, the bank acquired Lake Michigan Financial Corporation for $187.4 million in cash and stock.

In August 2016, the bank acquired Talmer Bancorp for $1.7 billion in cash and stock.

In 2017, David B. Ramaker, president and chief executive officer of the bank, retired and was succeeded by David T. Provost.

On July 25, 2018, the company announced the move of its headquarters, along with over 500 employees, to Detroit.

TCF Financial Corporation
TCF Financial Corporation began business in 1923 as Twin City Building and Loan Association. In 1936, it was given a federal charter and renamed as Twin City Federal Savings and Loan Association. 

In 1986, it became a public company.

In 1995, TCF increased its Michigan presence by acquiring the Great Lakes National Bank. From 1995 through 1998, the TCF Bank branches in Michigan operated under the Great Lakes National Bank name. In 1999, all of the branches were rebranded as TCF. It also acquired First Federal Savings Bank of Oakland County.

In 1997, the bank acquired Winthrop Resources Corporation.

In 2002, the University of Michigan announced that TCF Bank was selected as a preferred provider of banking services to students, faculty, and staff. The University terminated this agreement in 2015.

In 2004, the bank acquired of VGM Leasing, Inc.

In 2005, TCF Bank announced the sale of its Michigan headquarters building to Ann Arbor, Michigan real-estate company McKinley Associates, though part of the ground level remains a TCF Bank branch.

On November 6, 2006, TCF announced the sale of 10 branches in Battle Creek, Bay City, and Saginaw to Independent Bank.

Its first branch in Arizona was opened in Mesa, Arizona, on December 13, 2006. 

In 2008, TCF entered the commercial inventory finance business in the U.S. and Canada with the creation of TCF Inventory Finance, Inc.

In 2011, TCF entered the indirect auto finance business with the acquisition of Gateway One Lending & Finance.

It closed 37 branches in 2013 and another 33 in 2016. In some locations, it replaced the full-service branches with ATMs.

Controversies

Overdraft fees
In 2010, TCF Bank was sued regarding overdraft charges. The bank processed higher amount transactions first in order to drain customer accounts faster, allowing TCF to then increase the number of total overdraft charges from each of the smaller amounts remaining, as well as charging overdraft fees on a daily basis rather than posing one flat fee. In 2011, TCF Bank changed its overdraft policy to include a daily $28 fee. After public backlash, the bank reversed its policy in 2012.

Violation of Bank Secrecy Act
In January 2013, the Office of the Comptroller of the Currency assessed a $10 million fine on TCF for violating the Bank Secrecy Act for failure to file suspicious activity reports in a timely fashion.

Sponsorship 
TCF is the naming rights sponsor of the University of Minnesota's TCF Bank Stadium. In February 2019, it was announced that Chemical Financial had acquired the naming rights to Detroit's Cobo Center, which was renamed TCF Center in August 2019.

References

External links
Official website (Archive)

Huntington Bancshares
1917 establishments in Michigan
Companies formerly listed on the Nasdaq
American companies established in 1917
American companies disestablished in 2021
Banks established in 1917
Banks disestablished in 2021
Banks based in Michigan
2021 mergers and acquisitions
Companies based in Detroit
Economy of the Midwestern United States
Economy of the Southwestern United States